Bradley L. Williamson, (November 21, 1927 – December 25, 2013) known professionally as Slim Williamson, was an American record executive who owned several record labels. He purchased the Chart label in 1964 from Gary Walker for $350.00. He died on December 25, 2013.

Labels he owned/operated
Chart Records
 Great Records Co.
 Music Town Records
 Sugar Hill Records (Not affiliated with the Rap or Bluegrass labels of the same name)
Peach Records
Scorpion Records
Yonah Records

References

1927 births
2013 deaths
American music industry executives